Vladislav Andreyevich Volkov (born 15 August 1980) in Kyrgyzstan is a footballer who plays as a goalkeeper. He last played for FC Sumida Ulaanbaatar in the Mongolia. Also he was a Kyrgyzstan national football team player.

Career
In August 2013, Volkov moved to Tajik League side Khayr Vahdat FK.

Honors

Club
Dordoi Bishkek
Shoro Top League (7): 2005, 2006, 2007, 2008, 2009, 2011, 2012
Kyrgyzstan Cup (5): 2005, 2006, 2008, 2010, 2012
Kyrgyzstan Super Cup (2): 2012, 2013
AFC President's Cup (2): 2006, 2007

References

1980 births
Living people
Kyrgyzstani footballers
Kyrgyzstan international footballers
Kyrgyzstani people of Russian descent
Kyrgyzstani expatriate footballers
FC Dordoi Bishkek players
Expatriate footballers in Tajikistan
Association football goalkeepers
Tajikistan Higher League players